A sovereign wealth fund (SWF), sovereign investment fund, or social wealth fund is a state-owned investment fund that invests in real and financial assets such as stocks, bonds, real estate, precious metals, or in alternative investments such as private equity fund or hedge funds. Sovereign wealth funds invest globally. Most SWFs are funded by revenues from commodity exports or from foreign-exchange reserves held by the central bank.  

Some sovereign wealth funds may be held by a central bank, which accumulates the funds in the course of its management of a nation's banking system; this type of fund is usually of major economic and fiscal importance.  Other sovereign wealth funds are simply the state savings that are invested by various entities for the purposes of investment return, and that may not have a significant role in fiscal management.

The accumulated funds may have their origin in, or may represent, foreign currency deposits, gold, special drawing rights (SDRs) and International Monetary Fund (IMF) reserve positions held by central banks and monetary authorities, along with other national assets such as pension investments, oil funds, or other industrial and financial holdings. These are assets of the sovereign nations that are typically held in domestic and different reserve currencies (such as the dollar, euro, pound, and yen). Such investment management entities may be set up as official investment companies, state pension funds, or sovereign funds, among others.

There have been attempts to distinguish funds held by sovereign entities from foreign-exchange reserves held by central banks. Sovereign wealth funds can be characterized as maximizing long-term return, with foreign exchange reserves serving short-term "currency stabilization", and liquidity management. Many central banks in recent years possess reserves massively in excess of needs for liquidity or foreign exchange management.  Moreover, it is widely believed most have diversified hugely into assets other than short-term, highly liquid monetary ones, though almost no data is publicly available to back up this assertion.

History
The term "sovereign wealth fund" was first used in 2005 by Andrew Rozanov in an article entitled, "Who holds the wealth of nations?" in the Central Banking Journal. The previous edition of the journal described the shift from traditional reserve management to sovereign wealth management; subsequently the term gained widespread use as the spending power of global officialdom has rocketed upward.

Some of them have grabbed attention making bad investments in several Wall Street financial firms such as Citigroup, Morgan Stanley, and Merrill Lynch.  These firms needed a cash infusion due to losses resulting from mismanagement and the subprime mortgage crisis.

SWFs invest in a variety of asset classes such as stocks, bonds, real estate, private equity and hedge funds.  Many sovereign funds are directly investing in institutional real estate.  According to the Sovereign Wealth Fund Institute's transaction database around US$9.26 billion in direct sovereign wealth fund transactions were recorded in institutional real estate for the last half of 2012. In the first half of 2014, global sovereign wealth fund direct deals amounted to $50.02 billion according to the SWFI.

Early SWFs
Sovereign wealth funds have existed for more than a century, but since 2000, the number of sovereign wealth funds has increased dramatically. The first SWFs were non-federal U.S. state funds established in the mid-19th century to fund specific public services. The U.S. state of Texas was thus the first to establish such a scheme, to fund public education. The Permanent School Fund (PSF) was created in 1854 to benefit primary and secondary schools, with the Permanent University Fund (PUF) following in 1876 to benefit universities. The PUF was endowed with public lands, the ownership of which the state retained by terms of the 1845 annexation treaty between the Republic of Texas and the United States. While the PSF was first funded by an appropriation from the state legislature, it also received public lands at the same time that the PUF was created. The first SWF established for a sovereign state is the Kuwait Investment Authority, a commodity SWF created in 1953 from oil revenues before Kuwait gained independence from the United Kingdom. According to many estimates, Kuwait's fund is now worth approximately US$600 billion.

Another early registered SWFs is the Revenue Equalization Reserve Fund of Kiribati. Created in 1956, when the British administration of the Gilbert Islands in Micronesia put a levy on the export of phosphates used in fertilizer, the fund has since then grown to $520 million.

Nature and purpose

SWFs are typically created when governments have budgetary surpluses and have little or no international debt. It is not always possible or desirable to hold this excess liquidity as money or to channel it into immediate consumption. This is especially the case when a nation depends on raw material exports like oil, copper or diamonds. In such countries, the main reason for creating a SWF is because of the properties of resource revenue: high volatility of resource prices, unpredictability of extraction, and exhaustibility of resources.

There are two types of funds: saving funds and stabilization funds. Stabilization SWFs are created to reduce the volatility of government revenues, to counter the boom-bust cycles' adverse effect on government spending and the national economy. Savings SWFs build up savings for future generations.  One such fund is the Government Pension Fund of Norway. It is believed that SWFs in resource-rich countries can help avoid resource curse, but the literature on this question is controversial. Governments may be able to spend the money immediately, but risk causing the economy to overheat, e.g., in Hugo Chávez's Venezuela or Shah-era Iran. In such circumstances, saving the money to spend during a period of low inflation is often desirable.

Other reasons for creating SWFs may be economic, or strategic, such as war chests for uncertain times. For example, the Kuwait Investment Authority during the Gulf War managed excess reserves above the level needed for currency reserves (although many central banks do that now). The Government of Singapore Investment Corporation and Temasek Holdings are partially the expression of a desire to bolster Singapore's standing as an international financial centre. The Korea Investment Corporation has since been similarly managed.  Sovereign wealth funds invest in all types of companies and assets, including startups like Xiaomi and renewable energy companies like Bloom Energy.

According to a 2014 study, SWFs are not created for reasons related to reserve accumulation and commodity-export specialization. Rather, the diffusion of SWF can best understood as a fad whereby certain governments consider it fashionable to create SWFs and are influenced by what their peers are doing.

Concerns about SWFs
The growth of sovereign wealth funds is attracting close attention because:

 As this asset pool continues to expand in size and importance, so does its potential impact on various asset markets.
 Some countries, like the United States, which passed the Foreign Investment and National Security Act of 2007, worry that foreign investment by SWFs raises national security concerns because the purpose of the investment might be to secure control of strategically important industries for political rather than financial gain.
 Former U.S. Secretary of the Treasury Lawrence Summers has argued that the U.S. could potentially lose control of assets to wealthier foreign funds whose emergence "shake[s] [the] capitalist logic". These concerns have led the European Union (EU) to reconsider whether to allow its members to use "golden shares" to block certain foreign acquisitions. This strategy has largely been excluded as a viable option by the EU, for fear it would give rise to a resurgence in international protectionism. In the United States, these concerns are addressed by the Exon–Florio Amendment to the Omnibus Trade and Competitiveness Act of 1988, Pub. L. No. 100-418, § 5021, 102 Stat. 1107, 1426 (codified as amended at 50 U.S.C. app. § 2170 (2000)), as administered by the Committee on Foreign Investment in the United States (CFIUS).
 Their inadequate transparency is a concern for investors and regulators: for example, size and source of funds, investment goals, internal checks and balances, disclosure of relationships, and holdings in private equity funds.
 SWFs are not nearly as homogeneous as central banks or public pension funds.
 A lack of transparency and hence an increase in risk to the financial system, perhaps becoming the "new hedge funds".

The governments of SWF's commit to follow certain rules:
 Accumulation rule (what portion of revenue can be spent/saved)
 Withdraw rule (when the Government can withdraw from the fund)
 Investment (where revenue can be invested in foreign or domestic assets)

Governmental interest in 2008
 On 5 March 2008, a joint sub-committee of the U.S. House Financial Services Committee held a hearing to discuss the role of "Foreign Government Investment in the U.S. Economy and Financial Sector".  The hearing was attended by representatives of the U.S. Department of Treasury, the U.S. Securities and Exchange Commission, the Federal Reserve Board, Norway's Ministry of Finance, Singapore's Temasek Holdings, and the Canada Pension Plan Investment Board.
 On 20 August 2008, Germany approved a law that requires parliamentary approval for foreign investments that endanger national interests. Specifically, it affects acquisitions of more than 25% of a German company's voting shares by non-European investors—but the economics minister Michael Glos has pledged that investment reviews would be "extremely rare". The legislation is loosely modeled on a similar one by the U.S. Committee on Foreign Investments. Sovereign wealth funds are also increasing their spending. In fact, the Qatar wealth fund plans to spend $35 billion in the US in the next five years.

Santiago Principles

A number of transparency indices sprang up before the Santiago Principles, some more stringent than others.  To address these concerns, some of the world's main SWFs came together in a summit in Santiago, Chile, on 2–3 September 2008. Under the leadership of the IMF, they formed a temporary International Working Group of Sovereign Wealth Funds. This working group then drafted the 24 Santiago Principles, to set out a common global set of international standards regarding transparency, independence, and accountability in the way that SWFs operate. These were published after being presented to the IMF International Monetary Financial Committee on 11 October 2008. They also considered a standing committee to represent them, and so a new organisation, the International Forum of Sovereign Wealth Funds (IFSWF) was set up to maintain the new standards going forward and represent them in international policy debates.

As of 2016, 30 funds have formally signed up to the Principles, representing collectively 80% of the assets managed by sovereign funds globally or US$5.5 trillion.

Size of SWFs
Assets under management of SWFs amounted to $7.94 trillion as of 24 December 2020.

Countries with SWFs funded by oil and gas exports, totaled $5.4 trillion as of 2020. Non-commodity SWFs are typically funded by transfer of assets from official foreign exchange reserves, and in some cases from government budget surpluses and privatization revenues. Middle Eastern and Asian countries account for 77% of all SWFs.

Largest sovereign wealth funds

See also
 Boutique investment bank
 Fund of funds
 Global financial system
 Government Pension Fund of Norway
 Investment management
 List of exchange-traded funds
 List of hedge funds
 List of investment banks
 List of private-equity firms
 National wealth

References

Further reading

 Sovereign Wealth Fund Institute – What is a SWF? What is a Sovereign Wealth Fund? - SWFI
 Natural Resource Governance Institute & Columbia Center for Sustainable Investment "Managing the Public Trust: How to make natural resource funds work for citizens", 2014. 
 Castelli Massimiliano and Fabio Scacciavillani "The New Economics of Sovereign Wealth Funds", John Wiley & Sons, 2012
 Saleem H. Ali and Gary Flomenhoft. "Innovating Sovereign Wealth Funds" . Policy Innovations, 17 February 2011.
 M. Nicolas J. Firzli and Vincent Bazi, World Pensions Council (WPC) Asset Owners Report: “Infrastructure Investments in an Age of Austerity: The Pension and Sovereign Funds Perspective”, USAK/JTW 30 July 2011 and Revue Analyse Financière, Q4 2011
 M. Nicolas J. Firzli and Joshua Franzel. "Non-Federal Sovereign Wealth Funds in the United States and Canada". Revue Analyse Financière, Q3 2014
 Xu Yi-chong and Gawdat Bahgat, eds. The Political Economy of Sovereign Wealth Funds (Palgrave Macmillan; 2011) 272 pages; case studies of SWFs in China, Kuwait, Russia, the United Arab Emirates, and other countries.
 Lixia, Loh. "Sovereign Wealth Funds: States Buying the World" (Global Professional Publishing: 2010).

External links
 SWF Institute Organization dedicated to Studying Sovereign Wealth Funds
 International Forum of Sovereign Wealth Funds IFSWF is a voluntary group of SWFs – Set up by IMF
  
 Sovereign Wealth Fund Rank SWF Rankings 
 The impact of sovereign wealth funds on global financial markets – European Central Bank, Occasional Paper No 91. July 2008.
 Linaburg-Maduell Transparency Index – Point system on grading sovereign wealth fund transparency
 One Planet Sovereign Wealth Funds One Planet SWF Page

 
Foreign direct investment
Investment funds
Public finance
International finance